Greta Rosanna Bellamacina (born ) is a British actress, poet and model.

Early life
Bellamacina was born  in Hampstead, London, England, and raised in Camden. She discovered an interest in performing at an early age. She attended Royal Academy of Dramatic Art to study acting before attending King's College London where she graduated with a BA in English.

Acting 

Bellamacina made her acting debut at thirteen in Harry Potter and the Goblet of Fire (2005). She is best known for her roles as Celeste in the (2019) film Hurt by Paradise, Sally in Jamie Adam's film Venice at Dawn and Cleo Watson in Michael Winterbottom's 2022 political TV drama This England. Variety magazine has announced that "Bellamacina is set to lead Italy-U.K. feature Commedia (2022), helmed by Italian avant-garde film and theater director Riccardo Vannuccini". She is also set to star in Apple TV+'s The Essex Serpent.

She said:

She said:

Poetry 

Bellamacina was shortlisted as Young Poet Laureate of London in 2014.

In 2016, Bellamacina and artist Robert Montgomery co-founded New River Press. It was described by Another Magazine as "a publishing house fuelled by restlessness and a frustration with the state of contemporary poetry in Britain. Bringing together young, emerging poets with older and more established figures who may currently lack a platform for their work."

In 2016 Bellamacina co-wrote a collection of collaborative poetry with Montgomery entitled Points for Time in the Sky, a psychogeographical journey through modern Britain, and a rare example of collaborative poetry in British literature.

In 2018, she was commissioned by the National Poetry Library to write a group of poems for their Odyssey series, modern mediations on Homer's Odyssey. In the same year, she published her collection,Selected Poems 2015–2017.

Pierpaolo Piccioli commissioned Bellamacina to write ten love poems, published to coincide with his FW19 collection for Valentino fashion house. The poems were featured on the clothes as well as printed into a book which was placed on each seat before the show in Paris.

Bellamacina's critically acclaimed poetry collection Tomorrow's Woman was published in 2020 by US publisher Andrews McMeel Publishing alongside a volume of feminist poetry she edited titled Smear. In the same year the collection was translated into Spanish and published by Valparaíso Ediciones with translations by poet Juan José Vélez Otero. The collection was launched at the Shakespeare and Company bookstore in Paris.

The Financial Times described the collection as "beguiling, urgent, beautiful, lamenting, tender and powerful ode to the complexities of contemporary womanhood" and Bellamacina as a "cultural Trojan horse".

Awards 
In 2019, Bellamacina's debut film Hurt by Paradise was nominated for "Best UK Feature" at both Raindance Film Festival and Edinburgh International Film Festival 73rd edition. Bellamacina was also nominated for the prestigious Michael Powell Award for her performance as Celeste. Filmotomy said "Bellamacina has it in her to become one of the great contemporary female voices in British cinema." The Evening Standard wrote, "Bellamacina is as precise and bold as Joanna Hogg."

In 2022, Bellamacina won the Stanley Kubrick Award for Best Actress at the Stanley Film Awards for her performance in Riccardo Vannuccini's film Commedia.

Modelling 
Bellamacina has appeared in ads for brands such as Prada, Chanel, Rimmel London, Mulberry, Stella McCartney, Burberry and The Vampire's Wife.  She has walked in catwalk shows for Dolce & Gabbana.

Bellamacina has starred internationally on magazine covers such as Harper's Bazaar, Marie Claire Russia, Numéro Tokyo.

She has worked with photographers such as Jurgen Teller, Liz Collins, Tom Craig, Cass Bird, Oliver Hadlee Pearch and Jack Davidson.

Personal life

Bellamacina is married to Scottish artist-poet Robert Montgomery, and the couple have two children.

Filmography

Film

Television

Theatre

References

External links
 
 Interview Magazine, "Greta Bellamacina's Modern Poetry", Interview .
 "I-D Magazine", young London poet greta bellamacina is on a mission to save Britain’s libraries, 6 February 2015 .
 Vogue Italia, An interview with Greta Bellamacina: poet, artist and model .
 Vogue UK, Poetry Corner, 10 July 2014 .
 I-D Magazine, fall in love with this collection of contemporary british love poetry .
 CR Fashion Book, A Surrealist Account: After Dark, Starring Greta Bellamacina .
 I-D Magazine, Watch the trailer for brand new documentary The Safe House: A Decline of Ideas exclusively on i-D.
 Harpers Bazaar UK, A San Francisco Love Story. 
 Harpers Bazaar UK, In Conversation With Vivienne Westwood.
 Purple.fr, Poet Greta Bellamacina at Hay Festival.

Living people
Actresses from London
Alumni of King's College London
Alumni of RADA
English people of Italian descent
English women poets
People from Hampstead
Year of birth missing (living people)